Mary Belle de Vargas (March 4, 1902 – January 18, 1946) was an American artist from Louisiana, known as "the Armless Marvel".

Early life 
Mary Belle de Vargas was born in Natchitoches, Louisiana, on March 4, 1902, the daughter of Richard de Vargas and Laure Dranguet de Vargas. Her father was a local jeweler and optometrist. Born without arms, she soon learned to use her strong legs, feet and toes, in place of her missing arms and hands; she was able to feed and groom herself, to write, draw and paint. She graduated from St. Mary's Academy in Natchitoches in 1921, and earned a college degree in arts and Spanish from Louisiana State Normal College in 1932.

Career 
In adulthood, de Vargas worked actively as an artist, from her own studio in Natchitoches. She won regional and national awards for her paintings, gave art lectures, taught art classes for children (including a future mayor of the city), and headed several professional art organizations. Her studio attracted curious visitors and tourists, who thrilled to see her autograph a photo souvenir, and took note of her adaptive clothing, sewn by her mother: capes instead of sleeves, trousers sewn into dresses to allow her the full use of legs without immodesty. She was featured on a cigarette card, and in a "Ripley's Believe it or Not!" cartoon panel.

Personal life 
Mary Belle de Vargas lived with her parents all her life. She died in 1946 at the age of 44, in Natchitoches. Her admirer and correspondent Gualterio Quinonas published a biography, The Armless Marvel, Mary Belle (1949). In 2005, there were plans for an exhibition of surviving paintings and drawing by de Vargas, in Natchitoches.

References

External links 

 

1902 births
1946 deaths
People from Natchitoches, Louisiana
Artists from Louisiana
Northwestern State University alumni